Fado ("destiny, fate") is a music genre that can be traced to the 1820s in Lisbon, Portugal, but probably has much earlier origins. Fado historian and scholar Rui Vieira Nery states that "the only reliable information on the history of fado was orally transmitted and goes back to the 1820s and 1830s at best. But even that information was frequently modified within the generational transmission process that made it reach us today."

Although the origins are difficult to trace, today fado is commonly regarded as simply a form of song which can be about anything, but must follow a certain traditional structure. In popular belief, fado is a form of music characterized by mournful tunes and lyrics, often about the sea or the life of the poor, and infused with a sentiment of resignation, fate and melancholy. This is loosely captured by the Portuguese word saudade, or longing, symbolizing a feeling of loss (a permanent, irreparable loss and its consequent lifelong damage). This is similar to the character of several musical genres in Portuguese ex-colonies such as morna from Cape Verde, which may be historically linked to fado in its earlier form and have retained its rhythmic heritage. This connection to the music of a historic Portuguese urban and maritime proletariat (sailors, bohemians, dock workers, port traders, fishwives and other working-class people) can also be found in Brazilian modinha and Indonesian kroncong, although all these music genres subsequently developed their own independent traditions.

Famous singers of fado include Maria Teresa de Noronha, Alfredo Marceneiro, D. Vicente da Câmara, Frei Hermano da Câmara, Amália Rodrigues, Dulce Pontes, Carlos do Carmo, Mariza, Mafalda Arnauth, António Zambujo, Ana Moura, Camané, Helder Moutinho, Carminho, Mísia, Cristina Branco, Gisela João and Katia Guerreiro. On 27 November 2011, fado was added to the UNESCO Intangible Cultural Heritage Lists. It is one of two Portuguese music traditions part of the lists, the other being Cante Alentejano.

Etymology

The word fado possibly comes from the Latin word fatum ("fate", "death" or "utterance"). The word is linked to the music genre itself, although both meanings are approximately the same in the two languages. Nevertheless, many songs play on the double meaning, such as the Amália Rodrigues song "Com que voz", which includes the lyric "Com que voz chorarei meu triste fado" ("With what voice should I lament my sad fate/sing my sad fado?").

The English-Latin term vates, the Scandinavian fata ("to compose music") and the French name fatiste (also meaning "poet") have been associated with the term fadista.

History
Fado appeared during the early 19th century in Lisbon, and is believed to have its origins in the bohemian areas of the capital such as Bairro Alto, Mouraria and Alfama districts. 
There are numerous theories about the origin of fado. Some trace its origins or influences to the Medieval "cantigas de amigo" (song of a friend), some  suggest some ancient Moorish influence and others point to the chants of Africans (enslaved?) sailing at sea, but none is conclusive. It possibly evolved and formed, from a mixture of several older musical genres.

Fado performers in the middle of the 19th century were mainly from the urban working-class, namely sailors, bohemians and courtesans in popular taverns, who not only sang but also danced and beat the fado. During the second half of the 19th century, the dance rhythms faded away, and the performers became merely singers (fadistas). 

The 19th century's fadista Maria Severa, a half Cigano woman considered scandalous by some at the time, was the artist who made this genre famous.

More recently Amália Rodrigues, known as the "Rainha do Fado" ("Queen of Fado") was most influential in popularizing fado worldwide. Fado performances today may be accompanied by a string quartet or a full orchestra.

Musicological aspects
Fado typically employs the Dorian mode or Ionian mode (natural major), sometimes switching between the two during a melody or verse change.
A particular stylistic trait of fado is the use of rubato, where the music pauses at the end of a phrase and the singer holds the note for dramatic effect. The music uses double time rhythm and triple time (waltz style).

Varieties
There are two main varieties of fado, namely those of the cities of Lisbon and Coimbra. The Lisbon style is more well known, alongside the status of Amália Rodrigues, while that of Coimbra is traditionally linked to the city's university and the style of medieval serenading troubadours. 
Modern fado is popular in Portugal, and has produced many renowned musicians.

Madonna explains fado at her 2021 concert film Madame X.

Coimbra fado

This fado is closely linked to the academic traditions of the University of Coimbra and is exclusively sung by men; both the singers and musicians wear the academic outfit (traje académico): dark robe, cape and leggings. Dating to the troubadour tradition of medieval times, it is sung at night, almost in the dark, in city squares or streets. The most typical venues are the stairsteps of the Santa Cruz Monastery and the Old Cathedral of Coimbra. It is also customary to organize serenades where songs are performed before the window of a woman to be courted.

As in Lisbon, Coimbra fado is accompanied by the guitarra portuguesa and viola (a type of guitar).  The Coimbra guitar has evolved into an instrument different from that of Lisbon, with its own tuning, sound colouring, and construction. Artur Paredes, a progressive and innovative singer, revolutionised the tuning of the guitar and its accompaniment style to Coimbra fado. Artur Paredes was the father of Carlos Paredes, who followed in his father's footsteps and expanded on his work, making the Portuguese guitar an instrument known around the world.

In the 1950s, a new movement led the singers of Coimbra to adopt the ballad and folklore. They began interpreting lines of the great poets, both classical and contemporary, as a form of resistance to the Salazar dictatorship. In this movement names such as Adriano Correia de Oliveira and José Afonso (Zeca Afonso) had a leading role in popular music during the Portuguese revolution 1974.

Some of the most famous fados of Coimbra include: Fado Hilário, Saudades de Coimbra ("Do Choupal até à Lapa"), Balada da Despedida ("Coimbra tem mais encanto, na hora da despedida" - the first phrases are often more recognizable than the song titles), O meu menino é d'oiro, and Samaritana. The "judge-singer" Fernando Machado Soares is an important figure, being the author of some of those famous fados.

Curiously, it is not a Coimbra fado but a popular song which is the most known title referring to this city: Coimbra é uma lição, which had success with titles such as April in Portugal.

See also
 Fados, a 2007 movie about fado by Spanish director Carlos Saura
 List of fado musicians

References

External links

 Fado Music in Alfama Neighborhood of Lisbon
 Portal do Fado - All about Fado is here

 
Portuguese music
Urban street dance and music
Masterpieces of the Oral and Intangible Heritage of Humanity